Isaac Elijah ben Samuel Landau (1801–December 6, 1876) was a Jewish-Russian preacher, exegete, and communal worker born at Vilna. At the age of 18 he settled at Dubno, his wife's native town, where he carried on a prosperous business. On Saturdays and holy days he used to preach in the synagogues, attracting large audiences. Owing to his eloquence Landau was chosen by the communities of Volhynia as member of the rabbinical commission appointed by the emperor in 1861, which necessitated his remaining for five months in St. Petersburg. In 1868 he was called to Vilna as preacher and dayan, which office he held till his death. At Vilna he established a kosher kitchen for Jewish soldiers.

Works 
Landau was a recognized authority in rabbinical matters, and many authors solicited his approbation of their works. He himself was a prolific writer, and was the author of the following commentaries: 
Ma'aneh Eliyahu (Vilna, 1840), on the Tanna debe Eliyahu, accompanied with notes on other subjects under the title Siaḥ Yiẓḥaḳ
 A double commentary on the Mekhilta (ib. 1844): Berurei haMiddot, on the text, and Mitzui haMiddot, glosses to the Biblical and Talmudic passages quoted in the commentary
 Patshegen (ib. 1858), on Proverbs
 Miḳra Soferim (Suwalki, 1862), on Masseket Soferim
Dober Shalom (Warsaw, 1863), on the daily prayers
Kiflayim leTushiyyah, on the twelve Minor Prophets (only that on Joel published, Jitomir, 1865) and on Psalms (Warsaw, 1866)
Patshegen haDat, on the Five Scrolls (Vilna, 1870) and on the Pentateuch (ib. 1872–75)
Aḥarit leShalom (ib. 1871), on the Pesaḥ Haggadah
Derekh Ḥayyim (ib. 1872), on Derek Ereẓ Zuṭa
Lishmoa' kaLimmudim (ib. 1876), on the aggadah of the talmudists
Simlah Ḥadashah, on the Maḥzor (published in the Vilna editions of the Maḥzor)

Landau published also Derushim le-Kol Ḥefẓehem (ib. 1871–77), a collection of sermons; and two of his funeral orations: Ḳol Shaon (Vilna, 1872; also translated into the Russian language), on the wife of Prince Potapov; and Ebel Kabed (Eydtkuhnen, 1873), on Samuel Straschun. He left besides a number of works still unpublished as of 1906.

References

 Its bibliography:
Fuenn, Keneset Yisrael, p. 632;
H. N. Steinschneider, Ir Vilna, pp. 92–97.

19th-century rabbis from the Russian Empire
1801 births
1876 deaths